Kelvin David Osorio Antury (born 29 October 1993) is a Colombian footballer who plays as a midfielder for Independiente Santa Fe emprestado pelo Cuiabá

Career

As a youth player, Osorio joined the youth academy of Paraguayan side Libertad, where he experienced "uneven terrain and matches that seemed more like small battles, of excessive force, shouting and little football".

Osorio started his career with Deportivo Cali in the Colombian top flight.

In 2014, he signed for Colombian second division team Boca Juniors de Cali.

Cortuluá
Before the 2015 season, Osorio signed for Cortuluá in the Colombian top flight, where he made 32 appearances and scored 1 goal. On 3 September 2015, he debuted for Cortuluá during a 0–0 draw with Santa Fe. On 14 September 2016, Osorio scored his first goal for Cortuluá during a 2–0 win over Deportes Tolima.

References

External links
 
 

1993 births
Living people
People from Caquetá Department
Association football midfielders
Boca Juniors de Cali footballers
Cortuluá footballers
Deportivo Pasto footballers
Patriotas Boyacá footballers
Independiente Santa Fe footballers
Cuiabá Esporte Clube players
Categoría Primera A players
Categoría Primera B players
Campeonato Brasileiro Série A players
Colombian footballers
Colombian expatriate footballers
Colombian expatriate sportspeople in Paraguay
Expatriate footballers in Paraguay
Expatriate footballers in Brazil
Colombian expatriate sportspeople in Brazil